Hunga cordata is a species of plant in the family Chrysobalanaceae. It is endemic to New Caledonia.

References

cordata
Endemic flora of New Caledonia
Endangered plants
Taxonomy articles created by Polbot